Frank "Muddy" Waters (January 30, 1923 – September 20, 2006) was an American football player and coach.  He served as the head coach at Hillsdale College (1954–1973), Saginaw Valley State University (1975–1979), and Michigan State University (1980–1982), compiling a career college football record of 173–96–7.  Waters was inducted into the College Football Hall of Fame as a coach in 2000.

Early years and playing career
Waters was born in Chico, California and grew up in Wallingford, Connecticut, where he attended Pawling School in Pawling, NY.  He was both football and track captain at the Choate School, from which he graduated in 1943, and where he was inducted into the Athletics Hall of Fame in 2004. He played fullback for Michigan State from 1946 to 1949 under coaches Charlie Bachman and Clarence Munn.

Coaching career

Hillsdale
His Hillsdale Chargers teams won 34 consecutive games from 1953 to 1957 while participating in the Michigan Intercollegiate Athletic Association. In 1955, his 9–0 team refused to play in the Tangerine Bowl when game officials prohibited the team's black players from participating. He was named NAIA Coach of the Year in 1957, a year in which the team played in the Holiday Bowl and was chosen by the Washington D.C. Touchdown Club as the best small college team in the country. In his final year at the school, its stadium was renamed "Frank 'Muddy' Waters Stadium."

Saginaw Valley State
After leaving Hillsdale with a 138–47–5 record, Waters went on to serve as the first head coach of the Saginaw Valley State University Cardinals from 1975 to 1979, posting a 25–26–2 record and capturing a Great Lakes Intercollegiate Athletic Conference title in his final season.

Michigan State
In 1980, Michigan State hired Waters as head football coach after an NCAA probation. Waters coached for three seasons, but got fired after a 10–23 record in three seasons. Despite his firing just before the last game of the season, Waters was popular enough with players and fans to be carried off the field after his final 24–18 loss to Iowa.

Later life and death
After leaving MSU's head coach position, Waters continued to live in East Lansing and participated as a member of the MSU community for the next two decades. He was inducted into the College Football Hall of Fame in 2000 in the Small College category.  Waters died of congestive heart failure at age 83 in Saginaw, Michigan.

Head coaching record

References

External links
 

1923 births
2006 deaths
Hillsdale Chargers football coaches
Michigan State Spartans football coaches
Michigan State Spartans football players
Saginaw Valley State Cardinals football coaches
College Football Hall of Fame inductees
Choate Rosemary Hall alumni
Sportspeople from Chico, California
Sportspeople from Saginaw, Michigan
People from Wallingford, Connecticut